Borgoricco is a comune (municipality) in the Province of Padua in the Italian region Veneto, located about  northwest of Venice and about  northeast of Padua. 
Borgoricco borders the following municipalities: Campodarsego, Camposampiero, Massanzago, San Giorgio delle Pertiche, Santa Maria di Sala, Villanova di Camposampiero.

Twin towns
Borgoricco is twinned with:

  Kemerhisar, Turkey, since 2003

References

External links
 Official website

Cities and towns in Veneto